Rome is the fourth-largest city in the European Union by population within city limits. No building of the historic centre of Rome is taller than St. Peter's Basilica, which dominates the skyline of the city.

Tallest buildings 
The list includes buildings (above ) in the city of Rome and its metropolitan area.

Tallest under construction – approved and proposed

See also

BNL BNP Paribas headquarters
List of tallest buildings in Italy

External links 

 Emporis.com report for Rome
 Skyscraperpage.com report for Rome

 
Tallest Buildings
Rome